Vegetia legraini is a species of moth in the family Saturniidae. It was described by Thierry Bouyer in 2004. It is found in Namibia.

References

Moths described in 2004
Legraini